Mohamed El Bachir Belloumi (born 1 June 2002) is an Algerian footballer who plays for Portuguse club Farense. He is the youngest son of Algerian football legend Lakhdar Belloumi.

Career
Bachir Belloumi start his career young with GC Mascara. On August 25, 2020, he was transferred in MC Oran. On January 16, 2021, Bachir Belloumi was promoted to MC Oran's first team, and played the first match against CR Belouizdad as a substitute. The first goal in his football career was against US Biskra in 6–0 victory. and with the encouragement of his father who was in the stands and celebrated with him. He left the club for Europe on september 2021.

International career
Bachir Belloumi was on the final list to participate in the 2020 UNAF U-20 Tournament qualifying for the 2021 Africa U-20 Cup of Nations and participated in all matches and scored one goal against Tunisia. On June 17, 2021, Belloumi was called up for the first time to the Algeria A' national football team in the opening match of the new stadium in Oran against Liberia and participated as a substitute in a 5–1 win.

Career statistics

Club

References

2002 births
Living people
People from Mascara, Algeria
Algerian footballers
Algerian Ligue Professionnelle 1 players
Association football midfielders
GC Mascara players
MC Oran players
Liga Portugal 2 players
S.C. Farense players
Algeria youth international footballers
Algerian expatriate footballers
Expatriate footballers in Portugal
Algerian expatriate sportspeople in Portugal
21st-century Algerian people